Carway is a hamlet in southern Alberta, Canada within Cardston County. It is a port of entry into the U.S. state of Montana opposite of Port of Piegan. Just on the other side of the border is the Blackfeet Indian Reservation in Glacier County, Montana.

Carway is on the southernmost point of Highway 2, which becomes U.S. Route 89 in Montana.

The hamlet was named by William Roberts, the first officer in charge of the station, by combining Cardston and highway.

Climate 
<div style="width:85%;">
Carway has a humid continental climate (Dfb) with mild, rainy summers and cold, snowy winters with annual snowfall averaging .

Demographics 
The population of Carway according to the 2008 municipal census conducted by Cardston County is 2.

See also 
Piegan–Carway Border Crossing
List of communities in Alberta
List of hamlets in Alberta
List of geographic names derived from portmanteaus

References 

Alberta land ports of entry
Cardston County
Hamlets in Alberta